James Cullen Ganey (April 22, 1899 – February 7, 1972) was a United States circuit judge of the United States Court of Appeals for the Third Circuit and previously was a United States district judge of the United States District Court for the Eastern District of Pennsylvania.

Education and career

Born in Phillipsburg, New Jersey, Ganey received a Bachelor of Laws from Lehigh University in 1920, and another from Harvard Law School in 1923. He was in private practice in Bethlehem, Pennsylvania from 1923 to 1937. He was the United States Attorney for the Eastern District of Pennsylvania from 1937 to 1940.

Federal judicial service

Ganey was nominated by President Franklin D. Roosevelt on June 11, 1940, to the United States District Court for the Eastern District of Pennsylvania, to a new seat authorized by 54 Stat. 219. He was confirmed by the United States Senate on June 13, 1940, and received his commission on June 19, 1940. He served as Chief Judge and as a member of the Judicial Conference of the United States from 1958 to 1961. His service terminated on August 30, 1961, due to elevation to the Third Circuit.

Ganey was nominated by President John F. Kennedy on August 3, 1961, to the United States Court of Appeals for the Third Circuit, to a new seat authorized by 75 Stat. 80. He was confirmed by the Senate on August 15, 1961, and received his commission on August 15, 1961. He assumed senior status on August 15, 1966. His service terminated on February 7, 1972, due to his death.

References

Sources
 

1899 births
1972 deaths
Lehigh University alumni
Harvard Law School alumni
United States Attorneys for the Eastern District of Pennsylvania
Judges of the United States District Court for the Eastern District of Pennsylvania
United States district court judges appointed by Franklin D. Roosevelt
20th-century American judges
Judges of the United States Court of Appeals for the Third Circuit
United States court of appeals judges appointed by John F. Kennedy
People from Phillipsburg, New Jersey